The 1927 Tulsa Golden Hurricane football team represented the University of Tulsa during the 1927 college football season. In their third year under head coach Gus Henderson, the Golden Hurricane compiled an 8–1 record and outscored their opponents by a total of 206 to 84.

Schedule

References

Tulsa
Tulsa Golden Hurricane football seasons
Tulsa Golden Hurricane football